Voscherau is a surname. Notable persons with this name include:

Carl Voscherau (1900–1963), German film actor
Henning Voscherau (1941–2016), German politician

References